"Original Sin" is the pilot episode of the Italian-British TV series Medici: Masters of Florence. It was written by Nicholas Meyer from a story by Frank Spotnitz and Nicholas Meyer and directed by Sergio Mimica-Gezzan. It was released on 9 December 2016. It got 8.04 million viewers and 28.90% of share.

Plot
When Giovanni di Bicci de' Medici is poisoned his son Cosimo takes over the family bank and asks Marco Bello to investigate the murder. Cosimo is elected to his father's seat on the Signoria where Rinaldo degli Albizzi, the family's rival, is pushing for war with Milan because they attacked Lucca. Twenty years earlier, Giovanni sent Cosimo and his younger brother Lorenzo to Rome with bribes to install a friendly cardinal as Pope and gain control of the Vatican's banking. Cosimo, who wants to be an artist, meets Donatello and falls in love with his beautiful model Bianca, but Giovanni finds out and has the studio shut down driving Bianca away.

Cast
 Richard Madden as Cosimo de' Medici
 Dustin Hoffman as Giovanni
 Stuart Martin as Lorenzo
 Annabel Scholey as Contessina de' Bardi
 Guido Caprino as Marco Bello
 Alessandro Sperduti as Piero
 Valentina Bellè as Lucrezia Tornabuoni
 Ken Bones as Ugo Bencini
 Lex Shrapnel as Rinaldo degli Albizzi
 Brian Cox as Bernardo Guadagni
 Brando Leon Rustici as Vieri
 Michael Schermi as Ricciardo
 Eugenio Franceschini as Ormando Albizzi
 Tatjana Nardone as Emilia
 Roberto Mantovani as Father Anselmo
 Miriam Leone as Bianca
 Ben Starr as Donatello
 Frances Barber as Piccarda
 Fortunato Cerlino as Mastro Bredani
 Steven Waddington as Cardinal Cossa
 Daniel Caltagirone as Pazzi
 Martino Duane as Cardinal Lampedusa
 Andrea Tidona as Pope Martin V
 Valentina Cervi as Alessandra Albizzi
 Andrea Bruschi as Andreas di Cecco
 Matthew T. Reynolds as Cardinal Bellini
 Chiara Centioni as Woman
 Fabrizio Matteini as Cardinal Mosca
 Alessandro Piavani as Bertolo
 Roberto Zorzut as 1st Merchant
 Roberto Trifirò as Cardinal Orsini
 Giuliano Ghiselli as Cardinal Torelli
 Antonio De Matteo as Claudio, guard
 Ennio Tozzi as Disheveled Man
 Costantino Comito as Husband
 Alberto Sette as Corona

References

External links
 

British television series premieres
2016 British television episodes
Television episodes set in Italy
Television episodes directed by Sergio Mimica-Gezzan
Television episodes written by Frank Spotnitz
Television episodes written by Nicholas Meyer
Drama television episodes
Alternate history television episodes